Hans K. Ziegler (March 1, 1911, Munich, Germany – December 11, 1999 Colts Neck Township, New Jersey, United States) was a pioneer in the field of communication satellites and the use of photovoltaic solar cells as a power source for satellites.

Life
Hans Ziegler was born in Munich, Germany. There, he studied at the Technische Hochschule, which is today the Technische Universität München (TUM), and began his career as Wissenschaftlicher Assistant (Scientific Assistant). Following that, he was a researcher in German industry for ten years. During the Second World War, he worked for the company Rosental Selb in Bavaria on high tension porcelain.

In 1947, he came to the US with Wernher von Braun under Operation Paperclip, by means of which the USA gained Nazi engineers and scientists. He went to the US Army Signal Corps' Laboratories in Fort Monmouth, New Jersey, and became a US citizen in 1954.

Ziegler's work in the US was very influential in the development of military electronics, especially in the electronics for the early phases of the US space program. During the thirty years he worked as an engineer in the field of electronics and electrical engineering in the research and development department of the U.S. Army in Fort Monmouth, N.J. (from 1947 to 1976), he held the top position of Chief Scientist for 12 years. In Fort Monmouth, he worked as a Scientific Consultant, Assistant Director of Research, Director of the Astro-Electronics Division and Chief Scientist (1959). After the Army was restructured, he became Deputy for Science and Chief Scientist of the US Army Electronics Command in 1963 and Director of the US Army Electronics Technology & Devices Laboratory from 1971 until his retirement.

In May 1954, after examining the solar cells of Daryl Chapin, Calvin Fuller and Gerald Pearson at Bell Laboratories, Ziegler wrote, "Future development [of the silicon solar cell] may well render it into an important source of electrical power [as] the roofs of all our buildings in cities and towns equipped with solar [cells] would be sufficient to produce this country's entire demand for electrical power."

Referring to silicon solar cells, he said to the head of the U. S. Signal Corps, General James O'Connell, at a meeting in September 1955, "In fact, in the long run, mankind has no choice but to turn to the sun if it wants to survive."

He and his team produced a report on the prospects for application of this technique in the field of communication and they named the supply of energy for artificial satellites as the most important application. He knew that he was not the first to suggest this application. For example, the science fiction author, Arthur C. Clarke had already made this suggestion in 1945, but without having a concrete technology for it at that time.

Ziegler participated in the development of the first planned satellites. The first satellite,
Explorer 1, still went into space without solar cells, since it was a quick, less-than-ideal solution after the start of the Sputnik to show the American public that America's scientists could also start a satellite. The actual scheduled satellite project, Project Vanguard, successfully put a satellite named Vanguard I in orbit around Earth on March 17, 1958.

Over the objections of the Navy, which still thought that solar cells were not a mature technology, this satellite had four solar cells on its outer hull, due to the persistent work of Ziegler, which powered the instruments and performed their duties reliably for more than seven years. After this success, solar cells were established as the energy supply for satellites. He was also involved with the development of the first communication satellite in the world, SCORE, which was started in 1958.

He was awarded the Meritorious Civilian Service Award by the US Department of Defense in 1963 as a " world pioneer in communications satellites and solar energy systems to power satellites". When he retired in 1977, he was decorated with the highest award of the Army for "exceptional civilian service".

Ziegler was the author of many technical papers, a member of the IEEE, and represented the US, in military and civilian matters, in many national and international committees. In 1958, he was a member of the US delegation to the International Geophysical Year in Moscow, USSR, and in 1964, he gave advice on the scientific activities in Antarctica and at the South Pole, under the direction of the US National Science Foundation.

Ziegler's wife Friederike died in 1996. He last lived in Colts Neck Township, New Jersey and died at the age of 88 on December 11, 1999. He was survived by his daughters, Christine Griffith and Friederike Meindl, and his son, Hans.

See also

 Solar power
 Solar panel
 Active solar
 Photovoltaic components, projects and howtos

References

External links
Relevant links on Fort Monmouth history site:
  PROJECT SCORE Dr. Hans K. Ziegler, writing in 1960 when he was chief scientist of US Army Signal Research and Development Laboratory, describes SCORE - 6k
 Hans Ziegler by Tex and Jinx McRary. Format: Audio Tape Reels. - 2k
 Name: Ziegler.jpg Date: November 04 2000 17:55:52. - 2k
 Biographical Information Files List
 Audio Visual List RADAR Set AN/PPS-9, Target Signatures, 1969, Audio Tape Reels. Radio Interview of Dr. Hans Ziegler by Tex and Jinx McRary, undated

Other sites:
Short biography at IEEE
Short quotation on the motivation of the USA in employing Ziegler
Projects Ziegler worked on

1911 births
1999 deaths
People from the Kingdom of Bavaria
People from Colts Neck Township, New Jersey
German emigrants to the United States
German people of World War II
German aerospace engineers
20th-century German inventors
Engineers from Munich
Technical University of Munich alumni
Operation Paperclip